Echt is a railway station located in Echt, Netherlands. The station was opened in 1862 and is located on the Maastricht–Venlo railway. Train services is operated by Arriva.

Train services
The following local train services call at this station:
Stoptrein: Maastricht Randwyck–Sittard–Roermond

External links
NS website 
Dutch Public Transport journey planner 

Railway stations in Limburg (Netherlands)
Railway stations opened in 1862
Railway stations on the Staatslijn E
Echt-Susteren
1862 establishments in the Netherlands
Railway stations in the Netherlands opened in the 19th century